Elias Petty Seeley (November 10, 1791 in Bridgeton, New JerseyAugust 23, 1846) was an American Whig Party politician who served as the 11th governor of New Jersey in 1833.

Politics 
Seeley was named to serve as governor after Samuel L. Southard stepped down from office to take a seat in the United States Senate. Seeley represented Cumberland County in the New Jersey Legislative Council from 1829 through 1833.

Death 
Seeley died on August 23, 1846, and was interred in Old Broad Street Presbyterian Church Cemetery in Bridgeton, New Jersey.

See also
List of governors of New Jersey

References

External links
Biography of Elias P. Seeley (PDF), New Jersey State Library
New Jersey Governor Elias Pettit Seeley, National Governors Association

Elias P. Seeley, The Political Graveyard

1791 births
1846 deaths
Governors of New Jersey
New Jersey lawyers
Members of the New Jersey Legislative Council
People from Bridgeton, New Jersey
Burials in New Jersey
New Jersey Whigs
Whig Party state governors of the United States
19th-century American politicians
19th-century American lawyers